Silja Suija (born 15 June 1974) is an Estonian cross-country skier. She competed at the 1994 Winter Olympics and the 2006 Winter Olympics.

Cross-country skiing results
All results are sourced from the International Ski Federation (FIS).

Olympic Games

World Championships

World Cup

Season standings

References

External links
 

1974 births
Living people
Estonian female cross-country skiers
Olympic cross-country skiers of Estonia
Cross-country skiers at the 1994 Winter Olympics
Cross-country skiers at the 2006 Winter Olympics
Sportspeople from Tartu